Thespieus lutetia is a butterfly in the family Hesperiidae. It is found in Brazil and Argentina.

References

Butterflies described in 1866
Hesperiini
Hesperiidae of South America
Taxa named by William Chapman Hewitson